This is a list of international sporting events in Taiwan:

Multi-sport Events

Archery

Athletics

Badminton

Baseball

1 The 2021 World Baseball Classic was originally scheduled for 2021, but has been rescheduled to 2023 due to the COVID-19 pandemic.

Basketball

Boxing

Canoeing

Climbing

Golf

Ice Hockey

Martial Arts

Pool

Rowing

Rugby

Soccer, Futsal

Softball

Soft Tennis

Squash

Table Tennis

Tchoukball

Volleyball

Other Sporting Events

Recurring Sporting Events

Former Sporting Events

Cancelled Sporting Events

See also
 Sport in Taiwan
 List of stadiums in Taiwan

References